Jeanne Elizabeth Schmahl (née Archer; 1846–1915) was a French feminist, born in Britain. She married a well-off husband who supported her while she worked as a midwife's assistant in Paris. She decided to avoid politics and religion and to focus on specific and practical feminist goals. She led a successful campaign to change the laws so women could legally bear witness and could control their own earnings. She launched the French Union for Women's Suffrage to campaign for the right of women to vote, but that was not achieved in her lifetime.

Early years
Jeanne Elizabeth Archer was born in Great Britain in 1846. Her father was English and her mother was French.
Her father was a lieutenant in the British Navy. She studied medicine in Edinburgh, but was not able to complete her course. 
Sophia Jex-Blake was trying to open the profession to women but had not yet succeeded.
Schmahl was a friend of Jex-Blake, and in contact with the feminist movement in England.
She went to France to continue her medical studies, but interrupted them when she married Henri Schmahl, a Frenchman from Alsace, and took the name of Jeanne Schmahl.
However, she acted as an assistant to professional midwives until 1893.
She became a French citizen in 1873 through her marriage.
She was supported by her husband and lived in comfort beside the Parc Montsouris.

Women's rights to witness and dispose of income
By 1878 Jeanne Schmahl had become active in groups led by Maria Deraismes and the pastor Tommy Fallot.
She joined the League for Raising Public Morality (Ligue pour le relèvement de la moralité publique), which was mainly concerned with making alcohol and pornography illegal. Schmahl joined Léon Richer's group after she became interested in women's rights.
Schmahl also joined the Society for the Amelioration of Woman's Condition which had been created by Maria Deraismes. Schmahl was incensed when she discovered that a woman had been dismissed from her job after she asked her employer not to give her wages to her alcoholic spouse.

Schmahl admired the British Married Women's Property Act 1882 and she believed a similar law would benefit French women.
Schmahl thought that the strategy of the groups, led by Richer and Deraismes, of mixing religion and politics with women's issues was a mistake. She thought this was "one of the great reasons for the movement's lack of success in France." She decided to instead direct her efforts at specific issues.
In January 1893 Schmahl founded the Avant-Courrière (Forerunner) association, which called for the right of women to be witnesses in public and private acts, and for the right of married women to take the product of their labor and dispose of it freely.
As Schmahl wrote in 1896,

The campaign aimed to mobilize middle- and upper-class women who had moderate and conservative views. Anne de Rochechouart de Mortemart (1847–1933), Duchess of Uzès and Juliette Adam (1836–1936) soon joined the Avant-Courrière, and Schmahl found support from Jane Misme (1865–1935), who later founded the journal La Française and Jeanne Chauvin  (1862–1926), the first woman to become a doctor of law.
Schmahl published a journal, L'Avant-Courrière.
The society grew to 200 members.
The Avant-Courrière managed to get the support of printing houses who printed posters at no charge for display across Paris and in major provincial cities.
The law to allow women to bear witness passed the Chamber of Deputies and the Senate in 1897.

The Chamber of Deputies passed the earnings bill in 1896.
The Senate stalled on this bill, and it was not until July 1907 that it finally approved a version of the act.
Schmahl then dissolved the l'Avant-Courrière, which had achieved its goals.
The 1907 Married Woman's Earnings Act was often called the "Schmahl Law".
The Act was incomplete. If a woman bought something with her earnings that she did not consume herself, such as a piece of furniture, it became her husband's property unless there was a marriage contract that specified otherwise. This would normally only be the case with prosperous couples.

Women's suffrage

The French Union for Women's Suffrage (UFSF: Union française pour le suffrage des femmes) was founded by a group of feminists who had attended a national congress of French feminists in Paris in 1908.
Most of them were from bourgeois or intellectual backgrounds.
The leaders were Jeanne Schmahl and Jane Misme.
Since 1901 Schmahl  had belonged to the Women's Suffrage (Suffrage des femmes) association led by Hubertine Auclert (1848–1914).
The UFSF provided a less militant and more widely acceptable alternative to Suffrage des femmes.
The sole objective, as published in La Française early in 1909, was to obtain women's suffrage through legal approaches.

The founding meeting of 300 women was held in February 1909. Cécile Brunschvicg (1877–1946) was made secretary-general.
Schmahl was the first president.
Eliska Vincent accepted the position of honorary vice-president.
The UFSF was formally recognized by the International Woman Suffrage Alliance (IWFA) congress in London in April 1909 as representing the French suffrage movement.
Although national in scope, the UFSF was very much Paris-based.
Schmahl stated that the campaign would be peaceable, and would start by asking for women to be able to vote in municipal elections and sit on municipal councils.

Schmahl resigned from the UFSF in 1911 due to disputes with Cécile Brunschvicg, although the reason given was health problems.
She was succeeded as UFSF president first by Eliska Vincent and then by Marguerite de Witt-Schlumberger,
Jane Misme stayed with the UFSF, which had 12,000 members by 1914.
Jeanne Schmahl died in 1915.
Her obituary said,

Selected publications

References

Sources

External links

1846 births
1915 deaths
French feminists
French activists
French women activists
French midwives
English people of French descent
French people of English descent
Alumni of the University of Edinburgh